Jinzhong railway station is a railway station on the Datong–Xi'an high-speed railway and the Taiyuan–Jiaozuo high-speed railway that is located in Jinzhong, Shanxi, China. It started operation on July 1, 2014, together with the Railway.

See also
Zhongdingwuliuyuan railway station, a freight station near the Jinzhong railway station.

References 

Railway stations in Shanxi
Railway stations in China opened in 2014